Hanna Skrollan Steinmüller (born 9 April 1993) is a German politician of the Alliance 90/The Greens who has been serving as a member of the Bundestag in the 2021 German federal election, representing the electoral district of Berlin-Mitte.

Political career 
In parliament, Steinmüller has been serving on the Committee on Housing, Urban Development, Building and Local Government. In this capacity, she is also her parliamentary group’s rapporteur on housing and urban development. 

In addition to her committee assignments, Steinmüller is part of the German-Austrian Parliamentary Friendship Group and the German Parliamentary Friendship Group for Relations with the Baltic States.

References

External links 
 

Living people
1993 births
People from Münster
21st-century German politicians
21st-century German women politicians
Members of the Bundestag for Alliance 90/The Greens
Members of the Bundestag 2021–2025
Female members of the Bundestag
Humboldt University of Berlin alumni